Night of Power is a novel by Spider Robinson. This is a speculative fiction tale about a race war that could have happened in New York. The book, written in 1984 although first published a year later, is set in the year 1996. The story revolves around an interracial family that has to deal with a black revolution in New York.

The title alludes to the Islamic holy day of Laylat al-Qadr, which is sometimes translated as "Night of Power".

Characters
Russell Grant is a 48-year-old designer who has made enough money from his unconventional inventions to retire early.

Jennifer is his 14-year-old daughter by his first marriage. She's characterized by the author as "a prodigiously bright and imaginative child."

Dena Grant is Russell's wife. She was born and raised in Halifax. She is a 37-year-old modern dancer coming to  New York  because "her old friend Lisa Dann has offered her a chance—one last chance—to dance in New York, and not just in New York but at the Joyce Theatre, the showcase, the worldwide Mecca of Modern dance."

Michael is a charismatic black man who is leading the revolution that the Grants find themselves caught up in.

José is the superintendent of Grant's apartment as well as being hired by Russell as a bodyguard for Jennifer. He is "a short dark handsome seventeen-year-old Puerto Rican with long unruly curls and an air of cynical amusement."

Footnotes

Sources, references, external links, quotations
 Author's site
 Publisher's site

1985 Canadian novels
1985 science fiction novels
Canadian science fiction novels
Fiction set in 1996
Novels set in New York City
Novels about racism
Novels set in the future